Uncle Tom and Little Eva may refer to:

 Uncle Tom and Little Eva (film), made in 1930
 Uncle Tom and Little Eva (painting), made in 1866